Endless Vision is a collaborative album by Hossein Alizâdeh and Djivan Gasparyan.
It was released on 3 February 2005, through Hermes Records in Iran and released on 14 February 2006 by World Village records in the United States.it was recorded at the Niavaran Palace on Tehran in 2003.

Alizâdeh plays on this album, the six-stringed shurangiz and Gasparyan plays the Duduk.

The album was nominated for a Grammy Award for Best Traditional World Music Album at the 49th Grammy Awards.

Track list

Personnel
Hossein Alizâdeh – Shurangiz
Djivan Gasparyan – Duduk, Vocal on "Mama"
Hamavayan Ensemble
Afsaneh Rasaei – Vocal
Hoorshid Biabani – Vocal
Ali Boustan – Shurangiz
Mohammad-Reza Ebrahimi – Oud
Ali Samadpour – Dammam, Vocal, Udu
Behzad Mirzaee – Daf, Tombak, Naqareh
Additional Musicians
Vazgen Markaryan – Duduk
Armen Ghazaryan – Duduk

Accolades

Grammy Awards 

|-
| width="35" align="center"|2006 || Endless Vision || Best Traditional World Music Album|| 
|-

References

2006 albums
Hossein Alizâdeh albums
Collaborative albums